Mauricio Mina Quintero (born 24 August 1982) is a footballer who playing for Orsomarso of the Categoría Primera B in Colombia. Born and raised in Colombia, he has been naturalized by Equatorial Guinea in order to play for that national team.

National team
Mina was going to represent Equatorial Guinea for the first time in May–June 2014. Like other Colombian players participating in this national team, Mina is of Black African descent, but has no tangible links with the country. He was renamed as Mauricio Ondo Mosquera.

He has scored twice in an unofficial friendly against Equatoguinean club Deportivo Ebenezer on 14 May 2014. His international debut was against Mauritania on 1 June 2014, scoring the first of three goals, for the 2015 Africa Cup of Nations qualifiers.

Titles
 Deportivo Pasto 2011 (Categoría Primera B Championship)

References

External links
 
 

1982 births
Living people
Sportspeople from Cauca Department
Equatoguinean footballers
Equatorial Guinea international footballers
Colombian footballers
Equatoguinean people of Colombian descent
Categoría Primera A players
Categoría Primera B players
Atlético F.C. footballers
Envigado F.C. players
Deportivo Pasto footballers
Águilas Doradas Rionegro players
Naturalized citizens of Equatorial Guinea
Association football forwards
Orsomarso S.C. footballers
Boyacá Chicó F.C. footballers